Sarasangi (pronounced sarasāngi) is a ragam in Carnatic music (musical scale of South Indian classical music). It is the 27th melakarta rāgam (parent scale) in the 72 melakarta rāgam system of Carnatic music. It is called Sowrasena in Muthuswami Dikshitar school of Carnatic music.
In Western music it is known as the Harmonic major scale.

Structure and Lakshana

It is the 3rd rāgam in the 5th chakra Bana. The mnemonic name is Bana-Go. The mnemonic phrase is sa ri gu ma pa dha ni. Its  structure (ascending and descending scale) is as follows (see swaras in Carnatic music for details on below notation and terms):
: 
: 

This rāgam uses the swaras chathusruthi rishabham, antara gandharam, shuddha madhyamam, shuddha dhaivatham and kakali nishadham.

By definition, Sarasangi, a melakarta rāgam, is a sampurna rāgam (has all seven notes in ascending and descending scale). It is the shuddha madhyamam equivalent of Latangi, which is the 63rd melakarta scale.

Janya rāgams 
Sarasangi has a few minor janya rāgams (derived scales) associated with it, of which Kamala manohari and Nalinakanti are popular. See List of janya rāgams for all rāgams associated with Sarasangi.

Compositions
Here are a few common compositions sung in concerts, set to Sarasangi.

Jaya jaya padmanabha by Swati Tirunal
Sourasenesham vallisham by Muthuswami Dikshitar
Nikela dayaradu by Ramaswami Sivan
Paripaliso guru vadiraja by R. K. Padmanabha
Vandeham govinda by M Balamuralikrishna
 "Tirupati malaiyurai Venkata vaa" by M. M. Dandapani Desigar

Film Songs

Language:Tamil

Related rāgams
This section covers the theoretical and scientific aspect of this rāgam.

Sarasangi's notes when shifted using Graha bhedam, yields 2 other major Melakarta rāgams, namely, Dharmavati and Chakravakam. Graha bhedam is the step taken in keeping the relative note frequencies same, while shifting the shadjam to the next note in the rāgam. For further details and an illustration refer Graha bhedam on Dharmavati.

Notes

References

Melakarta ragas